The Chapel of St. Catherine is a UNESCO World Heritage Site located in Old Goa in the same compound as Se Cathedral and the Church and Convent of St. Francis of Assisi. It was built in 1510 in the Baroque architectural style, and has a brown and white facade. It faces the Mandovi River and is part of the World Heritage Site, Churches and convents of Goa.  The chapel is not functional.

History 
It was erected by Afonso de Albuquerque, Portuguese conqueror, in 1510 to commemorate his victorious entry to the city of Goa on St Catherine's Day. Pope Paul III granted it status of cathedral in 1534 and it was rebuilt. The chapel was expanded in 1550 at the order of the governor Jorge Cabral, and a new altarpiece was installed as well.

References 

Colonial Goa
Monuments and memorials in Goa
World Heritage Sites in India
Portuguese colonial architecture in India
Tourist attractions in Goa
Roman Catholic churches completed in 1510
1510 establishments in India
1510s establishments in Portuguese India
Baroque architecture in India
1510 establishments in the Portuguese Empire
16th-century Roman Catholic church buildings in India
Roman Catholic churches in Old Goa